Assia Noris (16 February 1912 – 27 January 1998) was a Russian-Italian film actress. Born Anastasia Noris fon Gerzfeld (Anastassia Noris von Herzfeld), she appeared in over 35 films between 1932 and 1965.

She starred in films such as the Mario Mattoli 1936 film L' Uomo che sorride and Il signor Max (1937). She made several appearances alongside Vittorio De Sica when he was a young actor. She was married to the film directors Roberto Rossellini and Mario Camerini, appearing in several films made by the latter.

Selected filmography
 Three Lucky Fools (1933)
 Giallo (1933)
 The Wedding March (1934)
 Those Two (1935)
 But It's Nothing Serious (1936)
 The Man Who Smiles (1936)
 I'll Give a Million (1936)
 A Woman Between Two Worlds (1936)
 Il signor Max (1937)
 The Make Believe Pirates (1937)
The House of Shame (1938)
 I Want to Live with Letizia (1938)
 Department Store (1939)
Dora Nelson (1939)
 Heartbeat (1939)
 A Romantic Adventure (1940)
 One Hundred Thousand Dollars (1940)
 Honeymoon (1941)
 Love Story (1942)
 A Pistol Shot (1942)
 Strange Inheritance (1943)
 A Little Wife (1943)
 Captain Fracasse (1943)
 What a Distinguished Family (1945)
 The Ten Commandments (1945)
 La Celestina P... R... (1965)

Bibliography
 Gundle, Stephen. Mussolini's Dream Factory: Film Stardom in Fascist Italy. Berghahn Books, 2013.

External links
 

Italian film actresses
Russian film actresses
Emigrants from the Russian Empire to Italy
1912 births
1998 deaths
20th-century Italian actresses